Richard Rich, 1st Baron Rich (July 1496 – 12  June 1567), was Lord Chancellor during King Edward VI of England's reign, from 1547 until January 1552. He was the founder of Felsted School with its associated almshouses in Essex in 1564. He was a beneficiary of the Dissolution of the Monasteries, and persecuted perceived opponents of the king and their policies. He played a role in the trials of Catholic martyrs Thomas More and John Fisher as well as that of Protestant martyr Anne Askew.

Origins
According to some sources, Rich was born in the London parish of St Lawrence Jewry, the second son of Richard Rich by Joan Dingley, but this is disputed. Also, according to Carter, he was born at Basingstoke, Hampshire, the son of John Rich (d. 1509?), of Penton Mewsey, Hampshire, and a wife named Agnes whose surname is unknown. In 1509, Richard inherited his father's house in Islington, Middlesex. Early in 1551 he was described in an official document as "fifty-four years of age and more", and was therefore born about 1496 or earlier.

According to Sergeaunt (1889):

He had a brother, Robert, whom Henry VIII granted a messuage in Bucklersbury on 24 February 1539, and who died in 1557.

Career
Little is known of Rich's early life. He may have studied at Cambridge before 1516. That year, he entered the Middle Temple as a lawyer and at some point between 1520 and 1525 he was a reader at the New Inn. By 1528 Rich was in search of a patron and wrote to Cardinal Wolsey; in 1529, Thomas Audley succeeded in helping him get elected as an MP for Colchester. As Audley's career advanced in the early 1530s, so did Rich's, through a variety of legal posts, before he became truly prominent in the mid-1530s.

Other preferments followed, and in 1533 Rich was knighted and became the Solicitor General for England and Wales in which capacity he was to act under Thomas Cromwell as a "lesser hammer" for the demolition of the monasteries, and to secure the operation of Henry VIII's Act of Supremacy. Rich had a share in the trials of Thomas More and Bishop John Fisher. In both cases his evidence against the prisoner included admissions made in friendly conversation, and in More's case the words were given a misconstruction that could hardly be other than wilful. While on trial, More said that Rich was "always reputed light of his tongue, a great dicer and gamester, and not of any commendable fame." Rich also played a major part in Cromwell's fall.

As King's Solicitor, Rich travelled to Kimbolton Castle in January 1536 to take the inventory of the goods of Catherine of Aragon, and wrote to Henry advising how he might properly obtain her possessions.

Chancellor
On 19 April 1536 Rich became the chancellor of the Court of Augmentations, established for the disposal of the monastic revenues. His own share of the spoil, acquired either by grant or purchase, included Leez (Leighs) Priory and about 100 manors in Essex. Rich also acquired—and destroyed—the real estate and holdings of the Priory of St Bartholomew-the-Great in Smithfield. He built the Tudor-style gatehouse still surviving in London as the upper portion of the Smithfield Gate. He was Speaker of the House of Commons in the same year, and advocated the king's policy. Despite the share he had taken in the suppression of the monasteries, the prosecution of Thomas More and Bishop Fisher and the part he played under Edward VI and Elizabeth, his religious beliefs remained nominally Catholic.

Rich was also a participant in the torture of Anne Askew, the only woman tortured at the Tower of London. Both he and Chancellor Wriothesley turned the wheels of the rack to torture her.

Baron Rich

Rich was an assistant executor of the will of King Henry VIII, and received a grant of lands. He became Baron Rich of Leez on 26 February 1547. In the next month he succeeded Wriothesley as chancellor. He supported Lord Protector Edward Seymour in his policies, including reforms in Church matters and the prosecution of his brother Thomas Seymour, until the crisis of October 1549, when he joined with the John Dudley. He resigned his office in January 1552.

Prosecution of bishops

Rich took part in the prosecution of bishops Stephen Gardiner and Edmund Bonner, and had a role in the harsh treatment accorded to the future Mary I of England. But upon her accession, Mary showed Rich no ill will. He took an active part in the restoration of the old religion in Essex under the new reign, and was one of the most active persecutors. His reappearances in the privy council were rare during Mary's reign; but under Elizabeth he served on a commission to inquire into the grants of land made under Mary, and in 1566 was sent for to advise on the question of the queen's marriage. He died at Rochford in Essex, on 12 June 1567, and was buried in Felsted church.

In Mary's reign he founded a chaplaincy with provision for the singing of masses and dirges, and the ringing of bells in Felsted church. To this was added a Lenten allowance of herrings to the inhabitants of three parishes. These donations were transferred in 1564 to the foundation of Felsted School for instruction, primarily for children born on the founder's manors, in Latin, Greek and divinity. The patronage of the school remained in the founder's family until 1851.

Descendants
Rich's descendants formed the powerful Rich family, lasting for three centuries, acquiring several titles in the Peerage of England and intermarrying with numerous other noble families.

By his wife Elizabeth Jenks (Gynkes) (d.1558) he had 15 children. The eldest son, Robert (1537?–1581), second Baron Rich, supported the Reformation. One grandson, Richard Rich, was the first husband of Catherine Knyvet: another, Robert Rich, third Baron Rich (1559–1619) was created First Earl of Warwick (of the third creation) in 1618. This line failed with the death of the 8th Earl on 7 September 1759.

Rich had an illegitimate son named Richard (d. 1598) whom he acknowledged fully in his will with legacies and guardians for his minority, his education in the common law, and suitable marital arrangements. In this line of descent was his grandson the merchant adventurer Sir Nathaniel Rich, and his great-grandson Nathaniel Rich (nephew of the elder Nathaniel), a colonel in the New Model Army during the English Civil War.

Legacy
Since the mid-16th century Rich has had a reputation for immorality, financial dishonesty, double-dealing, perjury and treachery rarely matched in English history. The historian Hugh Trevor-Roper called Rich a man "of whom nobody has ever spoken a good word".

Depiction in the arts
Rich is the supporting villain in the play A Man for All Seasons by Robert Bolt, which shows his slide into corruption. In the subsequent, Oscar-winning film adaptation, John Hurt portrays him. Bolt depicts Rich as perjuring himself against More in order to become Attorney-General for Wales. More responds, "Why Richard, it profits a man nothing to give his soul for the whole world... but for Wales?". The final line of the film notes that Rich "died in his bed" in juxtaposition with More's martyrdom and the other major characters' untimely deaths. In the 1988 remake of the film, Jonathan Hackett portrayed Rich.

Rich is a supporting character in C. J. Sansom's Shardlake series of historical mystery novels, which are set in Henry VIII's reign. Rich is portrayed as a cruel villain who is prepared to subvert justice to enhance his property and position. He has a significant role in the plot of Sovereign, the third of the series, and in Heartstone, the fifth.

Rod Hallett played Rich in seasons two, three and four of the Showtime series The Tudors.

Rich (spelled Riche in the novels) appears in Hilary Mantel's three volumes about Thomas Cromwell, Wolf Hall, Bring Up the Bodies and The Mirror and the Light. Bryan Dick portrays him in the BBC television adaptation of the first two novels, Wolf Hall.

Notes

References

External links
Will of Sir Richard Rich, Lord Rich, proved 3 June 1568, PROB 11/50/176, National Archives Retrieved 1 July 2013
Luminarium Encyclopedia; England under the Tudors: Richard Rich, 1st Baron Rich

1490s births
1567 deaths

16th-century English nobility

Barons in the Peerage of England

English Anglicans

English MPs 1529–1536
English MPs 1536
English MPs 1539–1540
English MPs 1542–1544
English MPs 1545–1547

English Roman Catholics

Lord chancellors of England

Members of the Middle Temple

Merchants from London

Peers of England created by Edward VI
Rich family
Speakers of the House of Commons of England